Qez Qabri-ye Bahador (also Romanized as Qez Qabrī-ye Bahādor and Qez Qebrī-ye Bahādor; also known as Qez Qabrī-ye Bahādorī and Qez Qebrī-ye Seh) is a village in Baladarband Rural District, in the Central District of Kermanshah County, Kermanshah Province, Iran. At the 2006 census, its population was 54, in 10 families.

References 

Populated places in Kermanshah County